Anthoni van Noordt (c. 1619 – 23 March 1675) was a Dutch composer and organist.

Born in Amsterdam, where he lived throughout his life, he was the brother of Jacobus and Jan van Noordt. He became the organist of the Nieuwezijdskapel in 1652, and moved to take up a post at the Nieuwe Kerk in 1664, where he remained until 1673.

His known compositions are all for organ, and are in the tradition of Jan Pieterszoon Sweelinck and the North German school. There are ten psalm settings, of which nine include variations, and six fugal fantasias. The works are of a high quality, showing contrapuntal mastery and a sure technique. The works were printed in a Tabulatuur-boeck van psalmen en fantasyen (Amsterdam, 1659), now in the library of the Jagiellonian University, Kraków; the notation used is unusual, with manual parts on two six-line staves (known as Anglo-Dutch notation) and the pedal part underneath in German organ tablature.

Further reading
His compositions may be found in a copy by A.G. Ritter made in 1882, in Uitgave van oudere Noord-Nederlandsche Meesterwerken''' XIX (1896, 1976), the psalm settings in an edition by P. Pidoux (Kassel, 1954), and the psalms and fantasias in Jan van Biezen's edition (Amsterdam, 1976).
H. van Nieuwkoop: Anthoni van Noordt and the Organs of Seventeenth-Century Amsterdam, Organ Yearbook XXI (1990)
H. van Nieuwkoop: Anthoni van Noordt and Matthias Weckmann: Two Contemporaries'', (Weckmann Symposium: Göteborg 1991)

Sources
Randall H. Tollefsen/Johan Giskes, 'Noordt [Noort, Noord, Oort, Oord], van', Grove Music Online ed. L. Macy (Accessed 2007-06-10), http://www.grovemusic.com/

External links

German Baroque composers
Dutch male classical composers
Dutch classical composers
Dutch classical organists
Organists and composers in the North German tradition
German male organists
Musicians from Amsterdam
1610s births
1675 deaths
17th-century classical composers
17th-century male musicians
Male classical organists